The Ohio State Buckeyes men's soccer team represents Ohio State University in NCAA Division I men's college soccer competitions. The team is a member of the Big Ten Conference.

Ohio State has an overall record of 456–516–123 (.473) in their 68-year history. They have appeared in the NCAA Division I Men's Soccer Tournament 11 times (2000, '01, '04, '05, '07, '08, '09, '10, '14, '15, ‘22) including a Runner-up finish in the 2007 NCAA Division I Men's Soccer Tournament.

The Buckeyes have participated in the Big Ten Conference since the conference began sponsoring men's soccer in 1991. Since then, they have been 76–92–18 (.457) in the conference. The team has three regular season titles (2004, '09, '15) and three conference tournament titles (2000, '07, '09).

The team has played their home games at Jesse Owens Memorial Stadium since 1999. The facility has a Natural Grass surface and has a capacity of 8,000.

Brian Maisonneuve has been the head coach of the Buckeyes since 2018. He previously served as an assistant coach for the Indiana Hoosiers from 2010 to 2017 and played for the Columbus Crew from 1996 to 2004.

Seasons

Team Management

Head Coaching history 
These people served as the head coach for Ohio State's men's soccer program.

NCAA Tournament Results

Awards and honors

Team 
NCAA Division I Men's Soccer Championship
Runners-Up (1): 2007

Big Ten Regular Season Championships

Big Ten Tournament Championships

Individual 

 All-Americans
 Rich Nichols (LHB), 1951 Second Team
 Eugene Bak (RHB), 1954 Honorable Mention
 Richard Bertz (CHB), 1955 Honorable Mention
 Richard Bertz (IR), 1956 Honorable Mention
 Gunars Neiders (FB), 1956 Honorable Mention
 Hans Lesheim (CF), 1957 Honorable Mention
 Robert Black (GK), 1967 Honorable Mention
 Justin Cook (F), 2004 Third Team
 Xavier Balc (F), 2007 First Team
 Eric Brunner (D), 2007 First Team
 Liam Doyle (D), 2015 Third Team
 Big Ten Player of the Year
 2004: Justin Cook
 2007: Xavier Balc
 Big Ten Defensive Player of the Year
 2009: Doug Verhoff
 2010: David Tiemstra
 2011: David Tiemstra
 2015: Liam Doyle
 Big Ten Offensive Player of the Year
 2011: Chris Hegngi 
 Big Ten Goalkeeper of the Year
 2015: Chris Froschauer 
 2022: Keagan McLaughlin
Big Ten Midfielder of the Year
 2022: Laurence Wootton
 Big Ten Freshman of the Year
 1998: John Monebrake
 1999: John Tomaino
 2000: Justin Cook
 2009: Matt Lampson
 2021: Laurence Wootton 
 Big Ten Coach of the Year
 1992: Gary Avedikian
 1999: John Bluem
 2004: John Bluem
 2009: John Bluem
 2014: John Bluem

References

External links